Syrian-Turkish border clash may refer to:

December 2011 Syrian–Turkish border clash
2012 Syrian–Turkish border clashes